Paul Richard "Pete" Schrum (born Shrum; December 16, 1934 – February 17, 2003) was an American actor.

Schrum was born Canton, Ohio, and started acting while attending Catholic school. He is most memorable for playing Uncle Ed in the television series Gimme a Break! and Uncle Ed in the television movie The Jerk, Too.  He is also known for playing the shotgun-firing bartender Lloyd in Terminator 2: Judgment Day (1991). He died from a heart attack on 17 February 2003, aged 68.

Notable roles

Movies

Television

External links 
 
 

1934 births
2003 deaths
American male film actors
American male television actors
20th-century American male actors